Urša Kragelj (born 2 July 1988 in Šempeter pri Gorici) is a Slovenian slalom canoeist who has competed at the international level since 2003.

She won two bronze medals in the K1 team event at the ICF Canoe Slalom World Championships, earning them in 2010 and 2013. She also won a gold, a silver and a bronze medal at the European Championships.

Kragelj won the overall World Cup title in the K1 class in 2012.

She finished in 9th place in the K1 event at the 2016 Summer Olympics in Rio de Janeiro.

World Cup individual podiums

References

 2010 ICF Canoe Slalom World Championships 11 September 2010 K1 women's team final results. – accessed 11 September 2010.

External links
 
 

Living people
Slovenian female canoeists
1988 births
Canoeists at the 2016 Summer Olympics
Olympic canoeists of Slovenia
Medalists at the ICF Canoe Slalom World Championships
People from Šempeter pri Gorici
20th-century Slovenian women
21st-century Slovenian women